Asher ben Matzliach ben Phinhas was the 125th Samaritan High Priest from 1980-1982. He was the son of Matzliach ben Phinhas ben Yitzhaq ben Shalma, and the nephew of Abisha III ben Phinhas ben Yittzhaq ben Shalma. In 1982 he was succeeded by his brother Phinehas X ben Matzliach ben Phinehas. His son became high priest Aabed-El ben Asher ben Matzliach.

References 

Samaritan high priests
1895 births

1982 deaths